Dmitri Nikolayevich Yachanov (born 4 April 1972) is a Russian former professional ice hockey goaltender, who played for the Russia (2007 Channel One Cup and 2007 Karjala Tournament). After completing his career as a player, he became a coach.

Awards and honors

References

External links
 

1972 births
Living people
Ak Bars Kazan players
Toros Neftekamsk players
Torpedo Nizhny Novgorod players
Neftyanik Almetyevsk players
Krylya Sovetov Moscow players
SKA Saint Petersburg players
Russian ice hockey goaltenders